Joan Colebrook (Heale) (1910–1991) was an Australian American writer and journalist.

Life 
Joan Moffat Heale was born on 31 August 1910 and grew up on a dairy farm in Queensland, Australia. She took a BA from the University of Queensland in 1932 and worked as a freelance journalist. She married Mulford Albert Colebrook in 1933 and moved to England before settling permanently in Cape Cod in the US in the late 1940s. She had two sons and a daughter.

Works 
Colebrook wrote several novels and non-fiction books. She wrote journalism for magazines including Commentary, The New Republic and The New Yorker. One of her best received works was The Cross of Latitude, based on her experience as a social-worker and women's prison officer.

Novels 
 All That Seemed Final (1941)
 The Northerner (1948)

Nonfiction 
 The Cross of Latitude (1968)
 Innocents of the West (1979)
 A House of Trees (1987).

References 

1910 births
1991 deaths
Australian emigrants to the United States
Journalists from Queensland
American journalists
American women journalists
University of Queensland alumni
American women novelists
20th-century American novelists
20th-century Australian novelists
Australian women novelists